Duke of Vallombrosa was a title created for the House of Manca. The present holder is disputed.

History

The Dukes of Vallombrosa trace their origins back to Jayme Manca (d. 1300), an ally of James II of Aragon; they were made lords of the Morès and the Montemaggiore in the Kingdom of Sardinia in 1450. His descendants continued to distinguish themselves, including against the Moors, and were honored by King Ferdinand and Queen Isabella of Castile.

Marquessates
In 1614, the Marquessate of Morès in the Kingdom of Sardinia was created for Caterina Manca. The Marquis of Morès was an upgrading of the ancient title, Count of Morès.

In 1652, the Marquessate of Montemaggiore ("Monte Mayor") in the Kingdom of Sardinia was created for Pedro Ravaneda. The Marquis of Montemaggiore was an upgrading of the ancient title, Lord of Thiesi.

Dukedoms
In a span of approximately three decades, Don Antonio Manca, later the 5th Marquis of Morès, consolidated the various feudal possessions and relatively large inheritances from his extended family. In 1759, he inherited the fiefs of the Manca branch of the Barons of Usini (later Counts of San Giorgio) and, in 1774, he purchased Sarroch "Vigna di Orri". In 1775, he was given the fief of the island of Asinara and the title Duke of Asinara, after which the Marquis of Morès title could be used by the Duke's first son and heir apparent. In 1817, the Dukedom of Vallombrosa was conferred on his grandson, Vincenzo.

The 1st Duke of Vallombrosa, was first gentleman of the Court of King Victor Emmanuel I of Sardinia. When an anti-feudal revolt took place against the Duke of Asinara, who had refused to conform to the regulations of the Viceroy of Sardinia, Charles Felix (later King of Sardinia) decided to punish both the duke, who was stripped of his property, as well as the revolutionaries, leading the Duke and his family to relocate permanently to Paris. At the redemption of the fiefs, and elimination of feudalism, by the Crown (King Charles Albert) between 1838 and 1840, the Marquessates of Morès and Montemaggiore were both held by Vincenzo Manca.

Dukes of Vallombrosa and Asinara
 Giacomo Manca Ledà, 1st Marquis of Morès (d. 1667) m. Caterina Ledà Virde, Countess of Bonorva
 Antonio Manca Gaya, 2nd Marquis of Morès (d. 1728) m. Giuseppa Carnicer
 Giacomo Manca Carnicer, 3rd Marquis of Morès (b. 1672) m. Stefania Pilo Manca
 Stefano Manca Pilo, 4th Marquis of Morès (1699–1764) m. Anna Maria Amat Tola
 Antonio Manca-Amat, 1st Duke of Asinara (1729–1805) m. Giovanna Amat 
 Giacomo Manca-Amat, 2nd Duke of Asinara (born 1754) m. Rosina "Rosa" Amat Malliano
 Anna Maria Manca-Amat (b. 1779) m. Stefano Manca, Marquis of Villahermosa e Santa Croce (b. 1767).
 Vincenzo "Vincent" Maria Giuseppe Manca-Amat, 1st Duke of Vallombrosa and 3rd Duke of Asinara (1785–1850) m. 1831 Claire Galard de Béarn
 Riccardo "Richard" Giovanni Maria Stefano Manca-Amat, 2nd Duke of Vallombrosa and 4th Duke of Asinara (1834–1903) m. 1857 Geneviève de Pérusse des Cars
 Antoine Amédée-Marie-Vincent Manca-Amat, Marquis de Morès (1858–1896) m. 1882 Medora von Hoffman
 Louise Claire Isabelle Manca de Vallombrosa, Countess Lafond (1868–1918) m. 1888 Christian Charles Louis, Count Lafond (1853–1934)
 Amédée Joseph Gabriel Marie Manca-Amat, Comte de Vallombrosa (1879–1968) m. 1906 Adrienne Lannes de Montebello
 Louis Richard Manca-Amat, 3rd Duke of Vallombrosa and 5th Duke of Asinara (1885–1959) m. 1917 Marie-Thérèse du Bourg de Bozas
 Antoine "Tony" Manca-Amat, 4th Duke of Vallombrosa and 6th Duke of Asinara (1919–1982)

Ducal residences

On 25 April 1861, the 4th Duke purchased the Château des Tours, also known as the Villa Sainte-Ursule, in Cannes for 180,000 francs from the Marquess Conyngham. The Gothic Revival villa, later known as the Château Vallombrosa, was built by Sir Thomas Robinson Woolfield on behalf of Lord Londesborough between 1852 to 1856. The Duke added a chapel, decorated the hall, and enlarged the park. After the Duchesses death on 17 October 1887 at the Château d'Abondant in Eure-et-Loir, the Duke retired to Paris, never to return to Cannes. Château Vallombrosa was leased for a while to Prince of Wagram and his wife, Berthe von Rothschild. On 6 May 1890, in order to pay the debts accumulated by his adventurer son, Antoine, Marquis of Morès, the Château was sold to the wealthy German hotelier Henri-Martin Ellmer for 410,000 francs and another 30,000 francs for the furniture. Ellmer hired Laurent Vianay to expand and transform the villa into the Hôtel du Parc, which opened in 1893.

In 1893, the family had estates in Paris, in Eure-et-Loir (the Château d'Abondant), and in Sassari, Sardinia (the Ducal Palace, built between 1775 and 1806 as the family seat of the Dukes of Asinara). In 1899, the 4th Duke also sold the Ducal Palace to the Municipality of Sassari, which uses the Palace as its Town Hall.

See also 
List of Marquesses in Italy
List of dukes in the nobility of Italy

References
Notes

Sources

External links
Louis, Duke de Vallombrosa portrait at the State Historical Society of North Dakota

Vallombrosa e Asinara

Margraves of Italy